The Tibet Medal was authorised in February 1905 for all members of the Tibet Mission and accompanying troops who served at or beyond Siliguri from 13 December 1903 to 23 September 1904.

The medal was awarded in silver to combatant troops and in bronze to camp followers, with both eligible for the 'Gyantse' clasp. Approximately 3,350 silver medals were awarded, including about 600 to the first battalion the Royal Fusiliers, the only British Army unit present, and about 2,600 to members of the Indian Army, in addition to staff and support personnel. In excess of 2,500 bronze medals were awarded, mainly to those employed in transporting supplies over the difficult terrain, including to the Peshawar Camel Corps and locally recruited coolies.

See also
British expedition to Tibet

References

External links
Tibet Medal 1903-04 on medals.org.uk
Tibet Medal on the British Army Medals website
National Army Museum collections: Tibet Medal to Sepoy Iman Din, Queen's Own Corps of Guides

British campaign medals
History of Tibet